The Bridge is on Sirius XM Radio channel 17 and Dish Network 6032. It is devoted to gold-based Classic Hits / News Radio The channel is programmed by Mary Sue Twohy. The channel plays mainly 1970s acts, such as Fleetwood Mac, James Taylor, Carole King, Jackson Browne, Elton John, Jim Croce, The Eagles, America, and Billy Joel, along with some later 1980s and 1990s artists like Sting, Bonnie Raitt, and others. It was basically the 1960s and 1970s counterpart of the former StarLite channel for the Sirius service before the Sirius/XM merger replaced StarLite with The Blend (which covers adult contemporary music from the 1970s-now).

The Bridge, originally on Sirius channel 10, has often been removed from the lineup when the service wants to devote a channel to a single artist for a period of time, such as The Rolling Stones or The Who. On September 27, 2007, it was displaced by E Street Radio, devoted to the music of Bruce Springsteen. The channel could still be heard on Sirius' internet stream, however. These frequent and long-lasting periods of preemption have angered many subscribers.

The Bridge returned to the Sirius satellites on June 24, 2008 on channel 12, forcing Super Shuffle to take the SIR-2 stream formerly used by The Bridge.

On November 1, 2008, channel 12 switched to Led Zeppelin Radio, with The Bridge moved to channel 33.  On November 12, 2008, channel 12 became The Pulse as part of the Sirius/XM merger, moving Led Zeppelin Radio to channel 33 and forcing The Bridge to go on hiatus for the rest of the year. The Bridge returned to Sirius (and debuted on XM) on January 1, 2009.  The Bridge is available on Dish Network channel 6032. Until February 9, 2010, it was heard on DirecTV channel 849, but all of the Sirius XM programming was dropped in favor of Sonic Tap by DMX.

From February 14-March 13, 2009, the channel was temporarily pre-empted for Fireman Radio, a channel devoted to the music of Paul McCartney. From October 15-October 22, 2010, it was again pre-empted for Elton!, a channel devoted to the music of Elton John. From November 29-December 26, 2010, The Bridge was again pre-empted for Band on the Run Radio, another Paul McCartney oriented format.

On June 18, 2020, The Bridge moved from channel 32 to channel 17, replacing PopRocks. U2 X Radio took over The Bridge's former slot.

Core artists
The Beatles
Elton John
Eagles
Fleetwood Mac
James Taylor
Billy Joel
Simon & Garfunkel
Jackson Browne
Van Morrison
Crosby, Stills, Nash & Young
Bonnie Raitt
Gordon Lightfoot

See also
 List of Sirius Satellite Radio stations

References

External links
 SiriusXM: The Bridge

Sirius Satellite Radio channels
XM Satellite Radio channels
Mainstream adult contemporary radio stations in the United States
Sirius XM Radio channels
Radio stations established in 2001